In the Meantime is the third and final solo studio album by the British Fleetwood Mac vocalist and keyboardist Christine McVie, released in 2004 on Koch Records and Sanctuary Records Group. It was McVie's first solo recording since 1984, and the first since her departure from Fleetwood Mac.

All of the songs on the album were composed by McVie and/or her nephew Dan Perfect, with contributions from ex-Fleetwood Mac guitarist Billy Burnette; Robbie Patton, who co-wrote Fleetwood Mac's 1982 hit "Hold Me" with McVie; George Hawkins, ex-member of Mick Fleetwood's Zoo in the mid-1980s, and McVie's ex-husband Eddy Quintela.

In the Meantime reached number 133 on the UK Albums Chart and failed to enter the US Billboard 200. Debuting and peaking at number 32 on the US Independent Albums chart, it had sold around 20,000 copies in the United States up until 2005, according to Nielsen SoundScan. In a 2014 interview in the Los Angeles Times taken after her returning to Fleetwood Mac, McVie stated about the album that "It had some good songs on it, but I went about it all wrong. I did it the wrong way, with the wrong people, I didn’t want to fly, I didn’t want to promote it. I just did it in my garage and nothing happened with it. That caused a certain amount of angst, and then I just stopped.”.

Track listing

The Australian promo release included a new song not released anywhere else, called "Come Out to Play", and the US iTunes version featured an acoustic version of "Friend" as a bonus track.

Personnel 
 Christine McVie – vocals, keyboards (1–5, 7–12), synthesizers (2, 4, 5), acoustic piano (6)
 Dan Perfect – guitars, backing vocals (2, 4, 6–9, 12), programming (5, 9)
 George Hawkins – backing vocals (2, 4, 8, 9, 12), bass (3–7, 10, 11, 12)
 Steve Ferrone – drums
 Luis Conte – percussion (1, 3, 4, 8, 11, 12)
 Lenny Castro – percussion (2, 5, 6, 7, 9, 10)
 David Isaacs – backing vocals (7, 8)
 Billy Burnette – backing vocals (12)

Production 
 Produced by Christine McVie, Dan Perfect and Ken Caillat.
 Executive Producer – Martin Wyatt
 Engineered by Ben Georgiades, Dan Perfect and Claus Trelby.
 Assistant Engineers – Richard Edgeler and Mike Read
 Recorded at Swallow's Studio (Kent, UK); Sphere Studios (London, UK); Studio International (Ojai, California, USA).
 Mixed by Ben Georgiades, Christine McVie and Dan Perfect.
 Mastered by Howie Weinberg at Masterdisk (New York City, New York, USA).
 Photography – Mike Prior
 Design – Ryan Art
 Sleeve Notes – John Perfect

Notes 

2004 albums
Christine McVie albums
Albums produced by Ken Caillat